A voiceless bilabial implosive is a rare consonantal sound, used in some spoken languages. A dedicated IPA letter, was withdrawn in 1993.

Features
Features of the voiceless bilabial implosive:

Occurrence 
A rare and evidently unstable sound,  is found in the Serer of Senegal, the Owere dialect of Igbo in Nigeria, and in some dialects of the Poqomchiʼ and Quiche languages of Guatemala. It can also be found in Ngiti in the Democratic Republic of the Congo. It is also found in the Sunwar language of Nepal.

See also 
 Voiced bilabial implosive

References

External links
 

Bilabial consonants
Implosives
Voiceless oral consonants